Lucas Pantelis (born 12 March 1982) is a retired Greek Australian association football player who last played for Wellington Phoenix in the A-League in 2013.

Early life
Pantelis was born on 12 March 1982 in  Adelaide, South Australia. 

His father, Nick Pantelis, who migrated from the island of Kos, Greece, in 1964, played for West Adelaide SC in the NSL, and represented South Australia on 25 occasions between 1966 and 1971. He received an Award of Distinction from Football South Australia in 2003.

Club career
Pantelis signed for Adelaide United for the inaugural A-League season where he played 18 games scoring once. He missed almost the entire 2006–07 season with a serious knee injury, though returned to competitive action for United during their 2007 Asian Champions League campaign where he played in four games.  After an excellent 2007–08 season at Adelaide, many rumours arose about a possible transfer to Melbourne Victory however, he quashed these rumours when he signed a new deal with Adelaide United in January 2008 keeping him at the club until 2010.

On 19 November, it was revealed that Lucas reinjured his left knee, the same one that kept him out of the 2006–07 season. He made his comeback game on 9 January 2009 against Newcastle Jets at Hindmarsh Stadium in which Lucas scored the second goal in the 2–0 win and came off in the 81st minute.
On 15 May 2011 it was confirmed that he had signed a two-year contract with A-League side Wellington Phoenix.
Pantelis the suffered a third serious injury to his left knee – a full ACL rupture along with cartilage and meniscus tears during a pre-season match against Central Coast Mariners, and missed the entire 2011/12 season following surgery.

Career statistics
(Correct as of 16 January 2009)

1 – includes A-League final series statistics
2 – includes FIFA Club World Cup statistics; AFC Champions League statistics are included in season commencing after group stages (i.e. 2008 ACL in 2008–09 A-League season etc.)

Honours
With Australia:
 FIFA U-17 World Championship: 1999 (Runners-Up)
With Adelaide United:
 A-League Premiership: 2005–2006

Reference list

External links
 Adelaide United profile
 Oz Football profile

1982 births
Living people
Soccer players from Adelaide
Australian people of Greek descent
Association football midfielders
Australian soccer players
A-League Men players
National Soccer League (Australia) players
Adelaide City FC players
Adelaide United FC players
Wellington Phoenix FC players
Parramatta Power players
West Adelaide SC players
FK Beograd (Australia) players